Ahmed Marcouch (born 2 May 1969) is a Moroccan-Dutch politician, former police officer, civil servant and educator serving as Mayor of Arnhem since 2017. A member of the Labour Party (PvdA), he was a member of the House of Representatives from 17 June 2010 to 23 March 2017. He focused on matters of community development.

He was a member of the municipal council of Amsterdam from 11 March 2010 to 8 September 2010 and previously chaired the Slotervaart borough government from 1 May 2006 to 11 March 2010. Since 1 September 2017, he has been Mayor of Arnhem.

References

External links 
 
  House of Representatives biography

1969 births
21st-century Dutch politicians
Dutch civil servants
Dutch educators
Dutch Muslims
Dutch police officers
Labour Party (Netherlands) MEPs
Labour Party (Netherlands) politicians
Living people
Mayors of Arnhem
Members of the House of Representatives (Netherlands)
Municipal councillors of Amsterdam
Moroccan emigrants to the Netherlands
People from Nador Province